Muhammad Amirul Hisyam bin Awang Kechik (born 5 May 1995) is a Malaysian professional footballer who plays as a central midfielder for Malaysian club Kedah Darul Aman and the Malaysia national team.

Club career
Amirul was a product of the Tunku Anum state sports school in Kedah prior to joining Harimau Muda in 2013. While playing for the Tunku Anum sports school their team won the Minister of Education Challenge Cup for three years running. He was initially picked to join Kedah's 2013 President Cup squad but impressed coaches at a selection conducted by Harimau Muda C. He then went on to be part of Ong Kim Swee’s squad that played in the Queensland Premier League in 2014 and the 2015 Southeast Asian Games. In 2015, Amirul played in the S.League under Razip Ismail as the head coach.

Amirul has played for Malaysia in various age groups, and made his debut for the senior team on March 2016, in a 2018 FIFA World Cup qualification match against Saudi Arabia.

Career statistics

Club

International Appearances

Honours

Club
Kedah Darul Aman
 Malaysia FA Cup: 2017, 2019
 Malaysia Cup: 2016
 Piala Sumbangsih : 2017

International
Malaysia U-23
Southeast Asian Games
 Silver Medal: 2017

References

External links
 
 

1995 births
Living people
Malaysian footballers
Malaysia international footballers
Kedah Darul Aman F.C. players
Malaysia Super League players
Malaysian people of Malay descent
Footballers at the 2014 Asian Games
Association football midfielders
Southeast Asian Games silver medalists for Malaysia
Southeast Asian Games medalists in football
Competitors at the 2017 Southeast Asian Games
Asian Games competitors for Malaysia